Santiago Villagonzalo Lucero (May 23, 1904, date of death unknown) was a Filipino Visayan lawyer, politician and judge from Cebu, Philippines. He was mayor of the municipality of Ronda (1934–1936) and member of the House of Representatives for Cebu's 6th legislative district (1954–1956).

Early life 
Santiago V. Lucero was the son of Aquilino Lucero,  and born in Ronda, Cebu on May 23, 1904. He attended at the University of Manila's College of Liberal Arts, obtaining an associate in arts degree. Then in 1934, he acquired a law degree from the Philippine Law School, and on December 11, 1934, he was admitted to the Philippine Bar. Like his father, he and his siblings Felicisimo and Fermin would become mayor of Ronda. Santiago married Catalina Mercado who inherited her family's ancestral house in Carcar that was declared a heritage house by Ambeth Ocampo, chair of the National Historical Commission of the Philippines on May 28, 2010.

Career 
Santiago Lucero was a municipal clerk in Ronda in 1929 to 1930 and in 1932, he was a Senate clerk for a year. He then became municipal president (equivalent of mayor) of Ronda from 1934 until 1936, succeeding Fermin Lucero, his brother. He would later be replaced by Honorato Villalon.

Later, he was appointed Justice of Peace for the municipality of Carcar in 1936–1942, and Probation Office of the province of Cebu from 1946 to 1948. His appointment as the Assistant Provincial Fiscal of Cebu was made on July 18, 1948 by then President Elpidio Quirino, and he served in this post until 1953.

Running as a candidate of the Liberal Party, he was voted member of the House of Representatives of the 3rd Congress of the Republic, representing the 6th legislative district of Cebu from 1954 until 1956. As a congressman, he was member of the Committees on Codification of Laws, Judiciary, Mines and National Language.

References 

20th-century Filipino lawyers
University of Manila alumni
Philippine Law School alumni
Liberal Party (Philippines) politicians
1904 births
Mayors of places in Cebu
Members of the House of Representatives of the Philippines from Cebu
Filipino judges
Year of death missing
Senators of the 6th Philippine Legislature